Ighodaro is a surname. Notable people with the surname include:

Aita Ighodaro, British author
Claire Ighodaro, British-born Nigerian accountant
Irene Ighodaro (1916–1995), Sierra Leonean physician and social reformer
Osas Ighodaro, Nigerian-American actress, producer, host, and humanitarian